Vysoke is an urban-type settlement in Makiivka Municipality, Donetsk Raion of Donetsk Oblast in eastern Ukraine. Population:

Demographics
Native language as of the Ukrainian Census of 2001:
 Ukrainian 9.53%
 Russian 89.95%

References

Urban-type settlements in Donetsk Raion